The U.S. Highways in the U.S. state of West Virginia are owned and maintained by the West Virginia Division of Highways.

History

U.S. Highways

See also

References

 
US